The Ruhunu Regiment was a former Military reserve force of the Ceylon Army. The regiment was raised in 1954 in Galle with a detachment in Matara. It was disbanded in 1956 when S.W.R.D. Bandaranaike became prime minister as he considered the unit to be loyal to the opposition. Its personnel made up volunteer units of the Gemunu Watch when it was formed in 1962. Raised along with the Rajarata Rifles, it was one of only three geographically based regiments in the Sri Lanka Army.

See also
Rex De Costa

External links
GENERAL TI WEERATHUNGA VSV ndc jssc (Retd) REMEMBERED.

Disbanded regiments of the Sri Lankan Army
Infantry regiments of the Sri Lankan Army
Military units and formations established in 1954
Military units and formations disestablished in 1956
1954 establishments in Ceylon
1956 disestablishments in Ceylon